Gokyo is a small village in Solukhumbu District in the Himalayas of Nepal, at the foot of Gokyo Ri and located on the eastern shore of the third Gokyo Lake, Dudh Pokhari. Gokyo Cho (Dudh Pokhari). Almost all the buildings are guest houses for trekkers. The people who live in the village leave during the winter and move to other (lower) villages such as Namche Bazaar. To the southeast is the village of Chharchung.
In 1995, an avalanche killed 42 people, including 17 foreign nationals (13 Japanese, two Canadians, one Irish woman and a German).

References

External links
Photograph of the village and lake

Populated places in Solukhumbu District
Himalayas
Khumbu Pasanglhamu